The Black Reel Award for Outstanding Supporting Actress is an award presented annually by the Black Reel Awards (BRAs). It is given to honor an actress who has delivered an outstanding performance in a supporting role while working within the film industry.

Erykah Badu was the first winner of The Cider House Rules at the 1st Annual Black Reel Awards in 2000. Since its inception, the award has been given out to 21 actresses. Viola Davis is the current record holder with most wins in this category with 2 while, Octavia Spencer holds the record for most nominations in this category with 6. Angela Bassett currently has the most nominations in this category without a win. Janelle Monae is the only actress to earn multiple nominations in the same year for Moonlight & Hidden Figures at the 17th Annual Black Reel Awards.

Gloria Foster became the first posthumous acting nominee in Black Reel Awards history when she earned a nomination for The Matrix Reloaded at the 4th Annual Black Reel Awards. Eartha Kitt is the first and only actress to earn a nomination in this category for an animated performance prior to the introduction of the Outstanding Voice Performance category in 2009.

At age 25, Jennifer Hudson became the youngest winner in this category for Dreamgirls and at age 62, Phylicia Rashad became the oldest winner in this category for For Colored Girls.

Winners and nominees
Winners are listed first and highlighted in bold.

2000s
{| class="wikitable" style="width:100%;"
|- style="background:#bebebe;"
! style="width:11%;"| Year
! style="width:35%;"| Actress
! style="width:49%;"| Film
! style="width:5%;"| Ref
|-
| rowspan="6" align="center"| 2000
|- style="background:#B0C4DE"
| Erykah Badu
| The Cider House Rules
| rowspan="6" align="center"| 
|-
| Angela Bassett
| Music of the Heart
|-
| Lisa Gay Hamilton
| True Crime
|-
| Rebekah Johnson
| Liberty Heights
|-
| Queen Latifah
| The Bone Collector
|-
| rowspan="6" align="center"| 2001
|- style="background:#B0C4DE"
| Gabrielle Union
| Bring It On
| rowspan="6" align="center"| 
|-
| Lisa Bonet
| High Fidelity
|-
| Eartha Kitt
| The Emperor's New Groove
|-
| Nia Long
| Boiler Room
|-
| Sheryl Lee Ralph
| Deterrence
|-
| rowspan="6" align="center"| 2002
|- style="background:#B0C4DE"
| Nona Gaye
| Ali
| rowspan="6" align="center"| 
|-
| Marla Gibbs
| The Visit
|-
| Adrienne-Joi Johnson
| Baby Boy
|-
| Gabrielle Union
| The Brothers
|-
| Kerry Washington
| Save the Last Dance
|-
| rowspan="6" align="center"| 2003
|- style="background:#B0C4DE"
| Queen Latifah
| Chicago | rowspan="6" align="center"| 
|-
| Halle Berry
| Die Another Day
|-
| Joy Bryant
| Antwone Fisher
|-
| Viola Davis
| Solaris
|-
| Rosario Dawson
| 25th Hour
|-
| rowspan="6" align="center"| 2004
|- style="background:#B0C4DE"
| Anna Deavere Smith| The Human Stain
| rowspan="6" align="center"| 
|-
| Mary Alice
| The Matrix Revolutions
|-
| Gloria Foster (posthumous)| The Matrix Reloaded
|-
| Vivica A. Fox
| Kill Bill: Volume 1
|-
| Michael Michele
| Dark Blue
|-
| rowspan="6" align="center"| 2005
|- style="background:#B0C4DE"
| Sharon Warren| Ray| rowspan="6" align="center"| 
|-
| Joy Bryant
| BAADASSSSS!
|-
| Kimberly Elise
| The Manchurian Candidate
|-
| Nia Long
| Alfie
|-
| Jada Pinkett Smith
| Collateral
|-
| rowspan="6" align="center"| 2006
|- style="background:#B0C4DE"
| Taraji P. Henson| Hustle & Flow| rowspan="6" align="center"| 
|-
| Rosario Dawson
| Sin City
|-
| Thandie Newton
| Crash
|-
| Wanda Sykes
| Monster-in-Law
|-
| Tracie Thoms
| Rent
|-
| rowspan="6" align="center"| 2007
|- style="background:#B0C4DE"
| Jennifer Hudson| Dreamgirls | rowspan="6" align="center"| 
|-
| Clare-Hope Ashitey
| Children of Men
|-
| Angela Bassett
| Akeelah and the Bee
|-
| Shareeka Epps
| Half Nelson
|-
| Kerry Washington
| The Last King of Scotland
|-
| rowspan="6" align="center"| 2008
|- style="background:#B0C4DE"
| Viola Davis| Doubt '| rowspan="6" align="center"| 
|-
| Alice Braga
| Blindness|-
| Penélope Cruz
| Vicky Cristina Barcelona 
|-
| Taraji P. Henson
| The Curious Case of Benjamin Button 
|-
| Sophie Okonedo
| The Secret Life of Bees|}

2010s

2020s

Multiple nominations and wins
Multiple wins
 2 Wins
 Viola Davis

Multiple nominations

6 Nominations 
 Octavia Spencer

 5 Nominations
 Angela Bassett
 Viola Davis

 4 Nominations
 Janelle Monae
 Kerry Washington

 3 Nominations
 Naomie Harris
 Lupita Nyong'o
 Gabrielle Union

 2 Nominations
 Joy Bryant
 Rosario Dawson
 Shareeka Epps
 Taraji P. Henson
 Regina King
 Queen Latifah
 Nia Long
 Zoe Saldana
 Tessa Thompson

Multiple nominations from the same film
 Mo'Nique (winner), Mariah Carey and Paula Patton in Precious (2010)
 Phylicia Rashad (winner), Janet Jackson and Kerry Washington in For Colored Girls (2011)
 Pernell Walker and Kim Wayans in Pariah (2011)
 Naomie Harris & Janelle Monae in Moonlight (2017)
 Danai Gurira, Lupita Nyong'o & Letitia Wright in Black Panther (2019)
 Ariana DeBose & Rita Moreno in West Side Story'' (2022)

Age superlatives

References

Black Reel Awards
Film awards for supporting actress